The 2002 Copa Libertadores de América was the 43rd edition of CONMEBOL's premier club football tournament. It was won by the Paraguayan club Olimpia; their third title.

First round
The first round of the Copa Libertadores drew 32 teams into eight groups of four; two of these teams came from the preliminary round. In each group, teams played against each other home-and-away. The top two in each group advanced to the second round.

Real Potosí, Talleres, Tuluá, 12 de Octubre and Monarcas Morelia made their debuts in this tournament.

Group 1

Group 2

Group 3

Group 4

Group 5

Group 6

Group 7

Group 8

Second round

Bracket

Round of 16

|}

The first leg match between Olimpia and Cobreloa played in Calama was suspended at the end of the first half due to crowd interference; a coin was thrown at the referee Ángel Sánchez and sustained an injury. At half-time the result was 1–1, but CONMEBOL awarded Olimpia a 2–0 victory and closed Cobreloa's stadium for a period of time.

Quarterfinals

|}

Semifinals

|}

Finals

References

External links 
 2002 Libertadores Cup in CONMEBOL's Website
 Copa Libertadores 2002 in RSSSF

1
Copa Libertadores seasons